Evilive is a live album by the American punk rock band Misfits. It was initially released as a 7-song EP in December 1982 and later added 5 more songs and released as an album in October 1987. It was released on frontman Glenn Danzig's Plan 9 Records. The title of the album is a palindrome. The album is included in the Misfits' Box Set. There is a record company owned by Glenn Danzig under the same name.

Track listing

EP version

Side A and track 1 of side B recorded December 17, 1981, at The Ritz in New York City.
Tracks 2 and 3 of side B recorded November 20, 1981, at On Broadway in San Francisco.

Album version

Tracks 1–7 recorded December 17, 1981, at The Ritz in New York City.
Tracks 8–12 recorded November 20, 1981, at On Broadway in San Francisco.

Personnel

Band
 Glenn Danzig – vocals
 Doyle – guitar
 Jerry Only – bass guitar, backing vocals
 Arthur Googy – drums

Additional musicians
 Henry Rollins – backing vocals on "We Are 138"

References

Misfits (band) EPs
Misfits (band) live albums
Live EPs
1982 live albums
1987 live albums
1982 EPs
Plan 9 Records live albums
Plan 9 Records EPs